The SpVgg Burgbrohl is a German association football club from the town of Burgbrohl, Rhineland-Palatinate. Apart from football the club also offers other sports like basketball and volleyball.

The club's greatest success has been promotion to the tier five Oberliga Rheinland-Pfalz/Saar in 2013.

History
SpVgg Burgbrohl was formed on 13 March 1904.

The football department of the club was formed in 1973 as SG Brohltal as a cooperation of local clubs SpVgg Burgbrohl, TuS Niederoberweiler and SV Glees and, for the first three decades of its history, has been a non-descript amateur side in local football. After 35 years, in 2008, the SG Brohltal was dissolved and the football team joined SpVgg Burgbrohl because as a Spielgemeinschaft, the team could not legally rise above the level of its local football association and therefore would have been barred from promotion to the Oberliga.

The club earned promotion to the tier-five Rheinlandliga for the first time in 2003, a league it would play in for the next decade. Burgbrohl finished in the upper half of the table every season except in 2009–10, when it came thirteenth. The clubs era in this league culminated in 2013 when it won a championship and promotion to the Oberliga Rheinland-Pfalz/Saar.

In its first season there Burgbrohl finished tenth in the league.

During the 2016–17 season Burgbrohl finished last in the league. The goal difference of the last 17 games of the season was 3:216. At the end of the season the club was considered the worst of all clubs in the first five levels of German football and, following this unfortunate performance, subsequently withdrew its first team from game operations and has since played in the ninth-tier Kreisliga B.

Honours
The club's honours:

League
 Rheinlandliga
 Champions: 2013

Cup
 Rhineland Cup
 Runners-up: 2010, 2015

Recent seasons
The recent season-by-season performance of the club:

With the introduction of the Regionalligas in 1994 and the 3. Liga in 2008 as the new third tier, below the 2. Bundesliga, all leagues below dropped one tier.

Key

References

External links
 Official team site  
 Official website of the football department  
 Das deutsche Fußball-Archiv  historical German domestic league tables

{
Football clubs in Germany
Football clubs in Rhineland-Palatinate
Association football clubs established in 1973
Sports clubs established in 1904
1904 establishments in Germany